Chana Songkhram may refer to:

Wat Chana Songkhram, a Buddhist temple in Bangkok
Chana Songkhram Subdistrict, named after the temple
Wat Chana Songkhram (Sukhothai), a historical temple in Sukhothai Historical Park